Serhou Yadaly Guirassy (born 12 March 1996) is a professional footballer who plays as a forward for Bundesliga club VfB Stuttgart, on loan from Ligue 1 club Rennes. Born in France, he plays for the Guinea national team.

Early life
Guirassy was born in Arles, France, to Guinean parents from Touba, Boké Region.

Club career
Guirassy started his career playing for Montargis, Amilly and Laval.

Lille
In July 2015, Guirassy joined Lille from Laval, signing a four-year contract. The transfer fee was reported to be around €1 million.

1. FC Köln
Guirassy joined 1. FC Köln in July 2016, signing a five-year contract. Soon after arriving at Köln, he underwent meniscus surgery. Later in the first half of the 2016–17 season, muscular problems kept him out of action. He made his Bundesliga debut on matchday 26 on 1 April 2017, in a 2–1 defeat against Hamburger SV. Days later, he was again kept from playing by muscular issues. Towards the end of the season, Guirassy nursed an inflammation of the pubic bone joint.

Amiens
In January 2019, he was loaned to Amiens until the end of the season. Amiens exercised an option and bought the rights for Guirassy for the upcoming season. Transfer fees were reported to be about 5 to 6 million Euros. Amiens later took advantage of the option and turned the deal permanent.

Rennes
On 27 August 2020, Guirassy joined Ligue 1 side Rennes on a five-year deal. He scored his first two goals for the club in the same match, a 4–2 league win against Nîmes. On 20 October 2020, he scored his first Champions League goal in a 1–1 draw against Krasnodar in the 2020–21 season.

Loan to VfB Stuttgart
On 1 September 2022, he joined Bundesliga club VfB Stuttgart on loan for the 2022–23 season.

International career
Guirassy was born in France to Guinean parents. He was a youth international for France. However, he decided to represent the home country of his parents, Guinea, at senior level. He debuted with the Guinea in a friendly 0–0 tie with South Africa on 25 March 2022, held in Kortrijk, Belgium.

Career statistics

Club

International

Notes

References

External links

 

Living people
1996 births
People from Arles
Sportspeople from Bouches-du-Rhône
Association football forwards
Citizens of Guinea through descent
Guinean footballers
Guinea international footballers
French footballers
France youth international footballers
French expatriate footballers
Guinean expatriate footballers
Guinean expatriate sportspeople in France
French sportspeople of Guinean descent
Black French sportspeople
USM Montargis players
J3S Amilly players
Stade Lavallois players
Lille OSC players
AJ Auxerre players
1. FC Köln players
1. FC Köln II players
Amiens SC players
Stade Rennais F.C. players
VfB Stuttgart players
Championnat National 3 players
Ligue 2 players
Ligue 1 players
2. Bundesliga players
Regionalliga players
Bundesliga players
Guinean expatriate sportspeople in Germany
Expatriate footballers in Germany
Footballers from Provence-Alpes-Côte d'Azur